Charlton Viaduct is a disused railway bridge in Shepton Mallet within the English county of Somerset. It is a Grade II* listed building.

The bridge was built in the 1870s to carry the Somerset and Dorset Joint Railway. It carried the railway over the River Sheppey. Originally the stone bridge carried a single railway track but was widened to carry a second track in 1892 using red bricks.

It is on a curve of   radius falling at 1 in 55 from each end to the midpoint. To cope with the curve the arches are strengthened by pilasters.

It can be seen from the grounds of Kilver Court where it forms a feature.

See also

References

External links

 Aerial video of the viaduct

Grade II* listed buildings in Mendip District
Railway viaducts in Somerset
Grade II* listed railway bridges and viaducts